"Incanto" is a song co-written by Tiziano Ferro, and Emanuele Dabbono. Ferro and Dabbono were subsequently credited as "joint co-writers" and the song was released as a single in January 2015. It was released as the second single from the compilation album TZN - The Best of Tiziano Ferro. The Spanish version (Encanto) was sung along with Spanish singer Pablo López.

The song was performed live for the first time February 10, 2015 to the first evening of the 65th edition of the Sanremo Festival, an event in which he participated as a special guest. At the same event also he performed a medley of Non me lo so spiegare, Sere nere and Il regalo più grande.

Music video
The video for "Incanto" was directed by Gaetano Morbioli, filmed at Milan, and it presented on the website of Italian newspaper la Repubblica on January 20, 2015. The video shows various movies showing a typical days of the artist, from the alarm clock meetings with fans.

February 24, 2015 was published on profile Vevo artist the video for Encanto, the Spanish version of the song. Also directed by Gaetano Morbioli, it shows the same images clip Italian alternate with those of Pablo López who plays his parts.

Track listing
Digital download (Italian)
"Incanto" – 3:32

Digital download (Spanish)
"Encanto" (with Pablo López) – 3:32

Charts

Certifications

References

External links
 Tiziano ferro official website
 "Incanto" Official Music video
 "Encanto feat. Pablo López" Official Music video

2015 singles
Italian-language songs
Spanish-language songs
Tiziano Ferro songs
Songs written by Tiziano Ferro
2014 songs
EMI Records singles
Song recordings produced by Michele Canova